The Atomic Energy Council (AEC) is an independent government agency of the Executive Yuan of the Republic of China (Taiwan) which is responsible for atomic safety, development and regulations. It also conducts research and development into atomic technologies. AEC is affiliated with IAEA by special agreements to safeguard the peaceful development of the nuclear energy by the Republic of China government.

History 
The agency was created in 1955 by the Executive Yuan. Since then, it has assisted industry in developing nuclear power for commercial use and allowed universities to conduct research into atomic energy.

The agency is still primarily responsible for the supervision of nuclear power plants, nuclear facilities, and radiation workplaces. It also strictly implement the laws for nuclear safety control, radiation protection, environmental detection, and proper administration of radioactive waste management to ensure the safety of nuclear applications, general public and investigate applications for atomic energy.

Administrative Structure 
The agency is organized into the following areas.

Departments
 Department of Nuclear Technology
 Department of Radiation Protection
 Department of Nuclear Regulation
 Department of Planning

Offices
 Office of Security
 Office of Personnel
 Office of Accounting
 Secretariat

Agencies
 Radiation Monitoring Center
 Fuel Cycle and Materials Administration
 Institute of Nuclear Energy Research

Advisory Committees
 Advisory Committee on Nuclear Legislation
 Advisory Committee on Nuclear Facility Safety
 Advisory Committee on Ionizing Radiation Safety
 Advisory Committee on Radioactive Materials Safety
 Supervising Committee on Nuclear Safety of the Lungmen Station
 Advisory Committee on Nuclear Accident Investigation and Evaluation
 Evaluation Committee on Research and Development Achievements
 Advisory Committee on Handling of State Compensation Cases

List of Ministers

Transportation
The council is accessible within walking distance South West from Gongguan Station of the Taipei Metro.

See also 
 Longmen Nuclear Power Plant
 Nuclear power in Taiwan

References

External links 

  
 Introduction to AEC - The Atomic Energy Council 

1955 establishments in Taiwan
Executive Yuan
Government agencies established in 1955
Independent government agencies of Taiwan
Organizations based in New Taipei